Eugene Palmer may refer to:

 Eugene Palmer (criminal) (born 1939), American fugitive
 Eugene Palmer (artist) (born 1955), Jamaican-born British artist
 Joey Palmer (1859–1910),  Australian cricketer also known as Eugene Palmer